754 Malabar is a minor planet orbiting the Sun. It was discovered in 1906 by German astronomer August Kopff from Heidelberg, and was named in honor of a Dutch-German solar eclipse expedition to Christmas Island in 1922. Malabar is the name of a city and mountain in Indonesia. Its orbital plane is inclined at an angle of 24.6° to the plane of the ecliptic.

This is a Ch-class asteroid in the Bus asteroid taxonomy, showing a broad absorption band in its carbonaceous spectrum near a wavelength of 0.7 μm. This feature is interpreted as due to iron-bearing phyllosilicates on the surface. 754 Malabar spans a girth of 102.8 km. Between 2002 and 2022, 754 Malabar has been observed to occult sixteen stars.

References

External links
 
 

Background asteroids
Malabar
Malabar
XC-type asteroids (Tholen)
Ch-type asteroids (SMASS)
19060822